The Harry Jepson OBE Memorial Cup (formerly the Lazenby Cup until 2017) is an annual pre-season friendly between English rugby league teams Leeds Rhinos and Hunslet.

History
The Lazenby Cup was first played in 1912 after Tracey Lazenby donated the trophy to be played for by Hunslet and Leeds Rhinos with the proceeds going to junior rugby in the city. Hunslet and Leeds both played for the trophy until 1972, after Leeds played Bramley until 1985 when the trophy was retired until 2004 when the trophy was contested between Leeds and Hunslet again.

In 2017 the cup was renamed the Harry Jepson OBE Memorial Cup after Harry Jepson who was club president of Leeds Rhinos and had strong links to Hunslet and died in 2016.

Results

Winners

References

Leeds Rhinos
Hunslet R.L.F.C.